So What? (stylised in all caps) is the fourth studio album by British metalcore band While She Sleeps. It was released on 1 March 2019, through the band's independent label Sleeps Brothers, in collaboration with Search and Destroy, Spinefarm Records, UNFD, and Universal Music. The album was produced by the band themselves and Carl Bown.

Background and recording
On 7 June 2018, the band confirmed via social media that they were in the process of writing a new album. Production on the record was completed in October 2018. In an interview with Metal Hammer, guitarist Sean Long stated "I think people know the name While She Sleeps, but they don't have a real idea of what sort of band we are. That makes me really proud, and we are aiming to surprise people again."

Release and promotion
On 26 October 2018, the band posted an image of an individual in a white hazmat suit and gas mask across their social media. The figure held a flash drive, which the posts said contained new music from the band, and could be retrieved from these figures at numerous locations in England. The song on the drive was a snippet of the first single, "Anti-Social", which premiered on 28 October on Daniel P. Carter's BBC Radio 1's Rock Show. On the music video for "Anti-Social", the band announced the official title for their fourth studio album and its scheduled release date. The album was released through their own label Sleeps Brothers and in collaboration with Spinefarm Records. The band said that they wanted total creative control and so chose to self-release and partner up with a label. UK and European tour dates in February 2019 were announced in support of the album as well as the support acts, Stray from the Path, Trash Boat and LANDMVRKS. On 21 December, the band released the single "Haunt Me" and its corresponding music video, directed by bassist Aaron Mackenzie. Three weeks later, it was announced that the band would be supporting Architects on the North American leg of their "Holy Hell" headlining tour, along with Thy Art Is Murder.

On 30 January 2019, the band released the third single from the album "The Guilty Party". On 18 February, the band released a behind-the-scenes documentary from filmmaker Roscoe Neil, detailing the album's recording process and some difficulties the band faced leading up to the album's release. On 24 February, five days before album release, the band released the fourth single "Elephant".

Critical reception

So What? has received a generally positive reception for numerous music critics. Several reviews have indicated that the album is a slightly different direction for the band, drifting away from traditional metalcore roots in favor of a more alternative, even electronic, sound. Writing for Louder Sound, Stephen Hill calls the album "easily the most experimental and oddly challenging album the band have ever put together." Paul Travers of Kerrang! also notes the changes, saying "there are plenty of riff-heavy body-slams and fiery, politicised lyrics, but this is a shinier, more melodic, accessible and sonically polished affair than its predecessors." In his review for Exclaim!, Max Morin calls the album a "mixed bag where some ideas work and others don't," and criticizes it for feeling "more like a transparent attempt at marketability than genuine musical vision."

Loudwire named it one of the 50 best metal albums of 2019.

Track listing

Notes
 All track titles are stylised in capital letters.

Personnel
Credits adapted from AllMusic.

While She Sleeps
 Lawrence "Loz" Taylor – lead vocals
 Sean Long – lead guitar, backing vocals
 Mat Welsh – rhythm guitar, vocals, piano
 Aaran McKenzie – bass, backing vocals
 Adam "Sav" Savage – drums, percussion

Additional musicians
 Griffin Dickinson of SHVPES – additional vocals on track 10, "Back of My Mind"

Additional personnel
 Carl Bown – production, engineering, mixing, mastering
 While She Sleeps – production
 Rhys May – engineering
 Ste Kerry – mastering
 Giles Smith – photography

Charts

References

2019 albums
While She Sleeps albums
Search and Destroy Records albums
Spinefarm Records albums
UNFD albums